Castle of Santa Catalina may refer to:
Castle of Santa Catalina (Cádiz)
Castle of Santa Catalina (Jaén)
Castillo de Santa Catalina (La Palma)